Wuyanling National Nature Reserve is a nature reserve in Taishun County, in the southern part of Zhejiang Province. The reserve occupies a mountainous, forested area.

Wildlife
BirdLife International considers Wuyanling Reserve as an Important Bird Area (IBA). Birds of particular conservation value in the reserve include Cabot's tragopan, much studied in the reserve, and Elliot's pheasant.

A freshwater goby, Rhinogobius wuyanlingensis, has been collected from Wuyanling, described as a new species to science, and named after the reserve.

The reserve's inhabitants also include the Chinese giant salamander. A specimen weighing , the largest one for a while, was observed in September 2012. This species, once common in the reserve, has greatly suffered from poaching.

Tourism
A small part of the reserve is developed as a touristic area; the rest of the park is not accessible to the general public. The network of trails follows two streams, and since 2012, includes a paved path to the Baiyun Peak. In 2012, the scenic area was rated as a 3A touristic attraction.

Baiyun Peak

At , the Baiyun Peak (Baiyunjian) is the highest mountain in Wenzhou. A paved path now leads to the top.

References

External links
 Wuyanling National Nature Reserve official page (in Chinese)
 Wuyanling Nature Reserve protectedplanet.net
 Wuyanling National Nature Reserve TravelChinaGuide.com

Nature reserves in China
Geography of Zhejiang
Tourist attractions in Zhejiang
AAA-rated tourist attractions